Wipeout 2048 is a racing game in which players pilot anti-gravity ships around futuristic race tracks. It was developed by Studio Liverpool and published by Sony Computer Entertainment. It was a launch game for the Sony PlayStation Vita hand-held console, released worldwide in 2012. It is the ninth instalment of the Wipeout series and the last game to be developed by Studio Liverpool before its closure in August 2012. Wipeout 2048 is a prequel to the first game in the series and is set in the years 2048, 2049, and 2050.

The game was designed as a testbed for the PlayStation Vita. During development, Studio Liverpool staff sent feedback about aspects that could affect the Vita design to Sony. Some of their suggestions, including the addition of a rear touchscreen and two separate joysticks, were added to the Vita.

Wipeout 2048 preserves some technical aspects of its predecessor game Wipeout HD, including downloadable content (DLC), online multiplayer mode, and cross-platform play with PlayStation 3 owners running Wipeout HD. It received mainly positive reviews; critics said its graphics and visuals showcased the power of the then-new PlayStation Vita but criticised its long loading times and other technical problems. The game, together with Wipeout HD and its Fury expansion, was remastered for PlayStation 4 and released as Wipeout Omega Collection in 2017.

Gameplay

Wipeout 2048 is a racing game in which players pilot anti-gravity ships through a variety of scenarios. It is set primarily in 2048 and is a prequel to the first instalment of the Wipeout series; dedicated race tracks have not yet been built, and races are held on city streets. The single-player game progresses through the first three years of the Anti-Gravity Racing Championships (AGRC) in 2048, 2049, and 2050. The game includes four types of ships: speed ships, agility ships, fighters, and prototypes. Speed ships are lightweight, Formula 1-like vehicles that emphasise acceleration and momentum, and are primarily used for speed-oriented races such as time trials. Agility ships are similar to rally cars and have extra manoeuvrability and handling; fighter ships are heavily armoured craft that sacrifice speed for combat power.

During races, numerous weapons may be picked up by flying the vehicle over coloured weapon pads. Yellow pads equip the player with offensive weaponry that can be used to destroy other racers whereas green pads provide defensive weapons such as mines, shields, and speed boosts. Game modes including one-on-one races, tournaments, time trials, speed laps, and Zone mode—which  revolves around survival as the player's ship automatically accelerates to extreme speeds—have been carried over from Wipeout HD.

The online multiplayer mode has the same races and modes as the single-player version. The online multiplayer is cross-platform, allowing players using the PlayStation 3 version of Wipeout HD Fury to play the Fury tracks with the PlayStation Vita. Wipeout 2048 also includes downloadable content (DLC); two DLC packages each offer twelve tracks and twelve ships for cross-platform play.

Development

Conception
Studio Liverpool's technical director Stuart Lovegrove said Wipeout 2048 was developed in parallel with the PlayStation Vita handheld gaming console and was a testbed for it. Lovegrove was aware the next Wipeout would be a launch game and said Studio Liverpool had made one before. Chris Roberts, the game's director of graphics, tools and technologies, said Sony Computer Entertainment involved Studio Liverpool at an early stage in the development of the PlayStation Vita and he had a "fairly good idea" of its capabilities. Jon Eggleton, former senior artist of the Wipeout series, said Studio Liverpool influenced the Vita's design. When staff were given development kits for a "next-generation portable [console]", a group was formed to brainstorm hardware details; proposals included a touchscreen device that was not yet conceived by Sony. Eggleton speculated the console was released with two analogue joysticks solely because "Studio Liverpool said it needed two sticks". During early development of Wipeout 2048 and the PlayStation Vita, the studio provided Sony with feedback on the hardware and its libraries, and sent updated application code to Sony's firmware staff to test their compilers. Lovegrove and Roberts were impressed with the simplicity of the Vita's firmware, which was in contrast to the architecture of the PlayStation 3 home console.

Design
The Wipeout 2048 development team recognised the PlayStation Vita and the PlayStation 3 are different. Lovegrove said designing for the Vita's smaller screen made it easier to develop, avoiding earlier problems of designing a game targeted for an HD screen but the studio had to ensure the game could run at any resolution. Roberts said, "it [was] less of a headache for artists" who wanted to tweak lighting effects. Roberts said the "most obvious" difference between the PlayStation 3's RSX Reality Synthesizer graphics processing unit (GPU) and the PlayStation Vita's ARM architecture is the Vita's lack of stream processing units (SPU). He said most of Wipeout HD SPU code was directed towards GPU support, which includes geometry culling, lighting effects and rendering. According to Roberts, the Vita's GPU and ARM architecture are more capable than the PS3 and handled Wipeout 2048 easily. Lovegrove, who had worked with the ARM architecture on the BBC Micro, said the team did not have to optimise anything to accomplish their goals and that it was enjoyable to see the ARM architecture running the game.

Although Wipeout 2048 and Wipeout HD have a shared shader program and did not require retooling for the Vita's architecture, Roberts said fine-tuning the shader effects for the Vita's GPU took significant time and attention. Lovegrove thought the method of working on a PlayStation 3 and its handheld counterpart was identical—a sentiment generally shared by the team—and Roberts said similarities between the systems helped the team "get moving quickly". Roberts added that the lighting system is identical to that of Wipeout HD; both games' ships share image-based lighting with blended, diffuse and specular highlights and  effects, and the vertex-based lighting system used for weaponry. According to Roberts, the main difference is the PlayStation Vita's use of the effects via the GPU whereas the PlayStation 3 relies on SPUs. The team decided to use anti-aliased colour buffers rather than depth buffers for real-time shadow rendering, creating better transparency effects because the memory cost of anti-aliasing is eight bits per pixel so 4x multisample anti-aliasing (MSAA) buffers contain the same amount of memory as a 32-bit depth buffer. Roberts also considered tone mapping an improvement, partly because of the Vita's superior support of buffer formats, which gives Wipeout 2048 better exposure control and bloom effects.

To accommodate the visual fidelity, the team compromised on the frame rate. Roberts said the decision was made early in development since they initially expected the PlayStation Vita could run PlayStation 3 assets at 30 frames per second (fps). The team used code from Wipeout HD as a reference to make the development process more efficient; the art and technical teams of Studio Liverpool worked in parallel. Lovegrove agreed 30 fps was always the goal because the team wanted to prioritise visual quality. In a Eurogamer interview, Roberts said Studio Liverpool was one of the first developers to use a dynamic framebuffer on the PlayStation 3: an algorithm that reduces resolution when the game engine is stressed, maintaining performance and optimising the frame rate. The technique, known as resolution throttling, was carried over from Wipeout HD to Wipeout 2048: according to Roberts: "If you are dead set on locking frame-rate and resolution your whole game is (graphically) restricted by the worst-case scenario".

Release and reception

Wipeout 2048 was released as a launch game for the PlayStation Vita in early 2012. It received generally positive reviews. It has an average score of 79 percent at Metacritic, based on an aggregate of 63 reviews, and was Metacritic's 20th-highest-ranked PlayStation Vita game of 2012. The game was nominated in the Best Handheld Game category at the 2012 Golden Joystick Awards. Wipeout 2048 was the second-best-selling PlayStation Vita game in the United Kingdom at the time of its launch, behind Uncharted: Golden Abyss.

Critics praised Wipeout 2048 graphics and visuals, calling them a showcase for the PlayStation Vita's power. Cam Shea of IGN enjoyed the detail and depth but questioned its visual design, saying the dark environments and cluttered worlds make the tracks ambiguous and less readable. Adam Goodall of Gameplanet called the graphics stunning and said it has a pervasive artistic statement, something he considered rare in video games—particularly racing games. According to Digital Spys Mark Langshaw and GamesRadar's Kathryn Bailey, the backdrops are superior to those of Wipeout HD; Langshaw said  they showcase the PlayStation Vita's graphical prowess. David Meikleham of the Official PlayStation Magazine wrote Wipeout 2048 "brilliantly shows off" the new hardware with its attractive lighting effects, solid frame rate and wide range of colours, and Dan Ryckert of Game Informer said its fast-paced races "do a good job" of displaying the Vita's graphical capabilities. Frédéric Goyon of Jeuxvideo.com liked the use of the PlayStation Vita's OLED screen, although he saw little difference between the graphical enhancements of Wipeout 2048 and Wipeout HD. According to Goyon, the game is "fluid in all circumstances" and is essentially Wipeout HD on a smaller screen. Heath Hindman of Game Revolution said although Wipeout 2048 "really shows off" the PlayStation Vita's graphical power, the game's sight distance is limited. Wipeout 2048 track design was largely praised. Simon Parkin of The Guardian enjoyed its "wholly contemporary" track details and visual consistency with previous instalments, and Peter Willington of Pocket Gamer called the track design the best in the series. According to Sebastian Haley of VentureBeat, Wipeout 2048 would have benefited from a "slightly braver" track design.

Willington noted the aliasing and said Wipeout 2048 was "undercutting the point" of Wipeout HD, a PlayStation 3 game. An Edge reviewer also called its visuals less exciting than those of the Wipeout series' typical science-fiction setting, noting Studio Liverpool "rewinds the timeline" to a less futuristic, more relatable setting. Martin Gaston of VideoGamer.com said Wipeout 2048 has a different but not inferior aesthetic design from the other games due to its "closer to home" near-future setting. According to GameSpot's Mark Walton, the smooth, beautiful visuals created a real feeling of speed and provide breathtaking vistas but is somewhat lacking in innovation. Paul Furfari of UGO enjoyed Wipeout 2048 visual style, calling it the only showcase for the PlayStation Vita's raw power. He singled out the Tron-like visual presentation of the Zone mode and the generally solid frame rate. Dale North of Destructoid said games in the series consistently showcase the system on which they were released and that Wipeout 2048 was a good launch game for the PlayStation Vita. North called it a beautiful game that is "as fast and flashy as its predecessors", that it "really impresses" on the PlayStation Vita's high-resolution screen and that the ships and futuristic backdrops seem to "pop right off the screen". Sebastian Haley of VentureBeat wrote the game adheres to the familiar, high visual standard set by previous Wipeout instalments.

Critics enjoyed Wipeout 2048 use of the PlayStation Vita's analogue control sticks. Jeuxvideo.com's Goyon praised the optimisation of the Vita's gyroscope and touchpad features, and the effective use of the analogue stick. According to Parkin, the technical impediments made it a learning curve for the developers; he said they did not intend to reduce the manoeuvrability of the PlayStation Vita's analogue stick in contrast to Wipeout HD. Digital Spy Mark Langshaw found the PlayStation Vita's analogue stick to be smooth and responsive, although he questioned its accessibility for players unfamiliar to the series. He enjoyed the use of the gyroscope and touchpad to manoeuvre and collect power-ups, respectively, but said the touchpad does not have the same level of accuracy as its physical alternative. The gameplay was well regarded, including its replay value and balanced difficulty. Game Informer Dan Ryckert considered the replay value moderate; although its analogue stick does a "good job" of controlling the ships, it has a noticeable lack of traction. According to Hindman, the game would have benefited from a customisable control configuration and the three default setups are unsatisfactory. Willington cited Wipeout 2048 as the best handheld Wipeout, praising its tight controls and variety of content. Edge praised the multiplayer mode, saying it "adds weight and value to the package" and gives a unique slant to the Vita's online potential.  Shea and Bailey noted the reduced frame rate of 30 fps, a step down from the franchise's traditional 60 fps. Jeff Gerstmann of Giant Bomb thought the frame rate occasionally affects gameplay and speed but said it was mostly stable. Ian Dransfield of Play praised the replay value and multiplayer functions, saying; "It's the sort of game you’ll find yourself coming back to again". David Meikleham called Wipeout 2048 balanced difficulty consistently excellent, praising its long campaign as "surprisingly hefty" and not an "on-the-go time-waster".

Although Wipeout 2048 gameplay was mainly well received, its long loading times were criticised. Gerstmann noted technical problems, particularly its loading times. IGN's Cam Shea called the 30-second loading time frustrating "when all you want to do is race" and Gameplanet's Adam Goodall described the long loading times as awful but said it is not enough to make the game a failure and that the overall game experience is "deeply satisfying". GamesRadar's Kathryn Bailey said the online mode is well-executed, highly accessible and a "credit to Wipeout". She said its user interface is clean and shiny, and called the touchscreen-based menu system "a pleasure to behold". The Guardian Simon Parkin criticised the protracted loading times, saying a pause at least twenty seconds too long has a negative effect in the era of "insta-fix mobile gaming on the rival platforms".

Willington found the lengthy load time plagued the game and was "totally at odds" with the normal pace of gameplay. Gaston said the loading time is "simply unforgivable"; he routinely waited over 50 seconds for a selected race to start, which minimised the ability to comfortably play "on the go". Walton also found the long loading times infuriating for a handheld game, and said having to wait more than 40 seconds to start a race is far longer than it should have been. Although Furfari found  the game had one of the longest loading times on the PlayStation Vita, he said it is not a "deal breaker" and that Wipeout 2048 is one of the few racing games for the console he recommended. Although Haley noted the substantial loading times, he said it is a common feature in PlayStation Vita launch games.

References

External links

 Official website – UK (archived)
 Official website – North America (archived)

2012 video games
Multiplayer and single-player video games
PlayStation Vita games
Sony Interactive Entertainment games
Video games developed in the United Kingdom
Video games set in the 2040s
Video games set in the 2050s
Video games with cross-platform play
Wipeout (series)
Video game prequels